Guo Xun (d. 75) was a military officer under the Han Dynasty of China. He was an associate general of Ban Chao, as he and Ban Chao were sent to the Western Regions for a diplomatic expedition by Dou Gu. In 75, he was killed along with Chen Mu by the rebels from the state of Yanqi and Qiuci.

75 deaths
Han dynasty generals
Year of birth unknown